Yannick Monnet (born 7 October 1975) is a French politician. He is a member of the French Communist Party (PCF) and, since June 2022, a member of the 16th National Assembly of France representing Allier's 1st constituency.

Career
Monnet has been a member of the PCF since 1995, when he was 19.

In 2021, he was elected to the Regional Council of Auvergne-Rhône-Alpes.

In the 2022 legislative elections, Monnet stood for election in Allier's 1st constituency for the PCF under the NUPES alliance. He came first in the first round with 30.6% of the vote, and was elected in the second round with 55.5% of the vote.

References

Living people
1975 births
Politicians from Moulins, Allier
French Communist Party politicians
21st-century French politicians
Regional councillors of Auvergne-Rhône-Alpes
Deputies of the 16th National Assembly of the French Fifth Republic